Mircea Buga (born 11 September 1968) is a Moldovan physician and politician.

Biography 
He has a medical background and is a politician who was the Minister of Labour, Social Protection and Family of the Republic of Moldova from 30 July 2015 to 20 January 2016. Before, in the period 18 February  2015 to 30 July 2015 he was the Minister of Health of the Republic of Moldova, succeeding Andrei Usatîi (2011-2015). In the Strelets Government, he switched his place with Ruxanda Glavan, taking over the Ministry of Labour, Social Protection and Family and ceding the Ministry of Health.
Mircea Buga has also been the General Director of the National Health Insurance Company (since 2009), and by that time, he was Deputy Minister of Health (2007-2009).

Since 20 November 2022 he is the First Vice-president of the European Social Democratic Party.

Personal life
Mircea Buga is married and has two children.

Note

External links
Mircea Buga – official CV on gov.md
Mircea Buga – official CV on Minister of Health website

1968 births
Living people
Politicians from Chișinău
Moldovan Ministers of Health
Physicians from Chișinău
Government ministers of Moldova